Walker F. Connor (June 19, 1926 – February 28, 2017) was Distinguished Visiting Professor of Political Science at Middlebury College (Middlebury, Vermont, USA).  Connor is best known for his work on nationalism, and is considered one of the founders of the interdisciplinary field of nationalism studies.

Before the collapse of European communism that began in the late 1980s, nationalism was not a subject of significant academic study and was generally neglected, with the exception of some major contributions by authors such as Ernest Gellner, Benedict Anderson, and Anthony D. Smith. Connor’s work is another exception to this rule, and today he is regarded as “one of the scholars of nationalism and ethnic conflict who has contributed most towards establishing a conceptual grounding” for the study of nationalism.

Widely cited for his insistence on the inherently ethnic character of nationalism, which he calls ethnonationalism to emphasize the point, Connor has long held that the most significant obstacle to advancing the study of nationalism is terminological imprecision.  Particularly problematic, he contends, is the tendency to conflate the distinct concepts of state and nation, as well as the respective concepts of patriotism and nationalism which derive from them.

Another significant theme in Connor's work is the passionate, nonrational character of nationalism.  When trying to understand national sentiment, he argues, the key is not chronological or factual history, but sentient or felt history.  National identity is based on the emotional psychology of perceived kinship ties – a sense of the nation as the fully extended family – and accordingly belongs to the realm of the subconscious and nonrational.

Finally, Connor is also well known for his analysis of Marxist-Leninist treatments of nationalism, which he deals with at length in his book The National Question in Marxist-Leninist Theory and Strategy.

Academic appointments and honours
Connor held resident appointments at, among others, Harvard, Dartmouth, Trinity (Hartford), Pomona, Rensselaer Polytechnic Institute, the London School of Economics, the Woodrow Wilson International Center for Scholars, Oxford, Cambridge, Bellagio, Warsaw, Singapore, and the Fulbright Visiting Research Chair in Ethnicity and Multicultural Citizenship at Queen's University at Kingston.

The University of Nevada named him Distinguished American Humanist of 1991-92, and the University of Vermont named him Distinguished American Political Scientist of 1997.

Selected publications

Publications by Connor

Publications by other authors
  (Includes a bibliography of Connor's work from 1967-2001.)

Notes

External links

Video

 

2017 deaths
1926 births
United States Army personnel of World War II
American political scientists
Georgetown University alumni
Harvard University staff
People from South Hadley, Massachusetts
Scholars of nationalism
University of Massachusetts Amherst alumni